Mikey Boyle is a hurler who plays with Ballyduff and Kerry.

Causeway Comprehensive School 

Boyle played with Causeway Comprehensive School during his school days. He helped the school to win the 2003 All-Ireland Vocational Schools Football Championship after a win over Holy Trinity College, Cookstown.

Club 

Boyle plays both football and hurling with Ballyduff and has enjoyed success in both codes.

His first major success with the club was when he won a Kerry Minor Hurling Championship with the club in 2003.

His next success would come in football as the club won a surprise back to back North Kerry Senior Football Championship when they beat Listowel Emmets in 2005 and 2006.

References

Teams

Living people
Ballyduff (Kerry) Gaelic footballers
Ballyduff (Kerry) hurlers
Kerry inter-county hurlers
Year of birth missing (living people)